Frank Griffel is a professor of Islamic studies at the Department of Religious Studies at Yale University.

Biography
Griffel earned his PhD in 1999 from the Free University of Berlin after studying philosophy, Arabic literature, and Islamic studies at institutions in Germany, Damascus, Berlin, and London. He was a research fellow at the Orient Institute of the German Oriental Society in Beirut, Lebanon. He joined Yale in 2000, where he teaches courses on Islamic intellectual history, theology and philosophy (both ancient and modern), and how Islamic intellectuals respond to Western modernity.

Works
 Al-Ghazali's Philosophical Theology
 The Formation of Post-Classical Philosophy in Islam

References

Yale University faculty
Free University of Berlin alumni
Living people
Year of birth missing (living people)